Three Fools Peak is a mountain peak of the Hozameen Range, located in Okanogan County, Washington.

The summit is 7,923 ft (2,415 m) in elevation.

See also
List of mountain peaks of Washington (state)

References

Mountains of Okanogan County, Washington
Mountains of Washington (state)